Carolina Creek is a  long 1st order tributary to Lanes Creek in Union County, North Carolina.

Course
Carolina Creek rises in a pond about 0.5 miles east of Mt. Pisgah Church, just north of the South Carolina state line.  Carolina Creek then flows north to meet Lanes Creek about 5 miles south of Allens Crossroads, North Carolina.

Watershed
Carolina Creek drains  of area, receives about 48.5 in/year of precipitation, has a topographic wetness index of 476.70 and is about 43% forested.

References

Rivers of North Carolina
Rivers of Union County, North Carolina
Tributaries of the Pee Dee River